Nelson Henriques (born 2 October 1986, Luanda, Angola) is an Angolan sprint canoeist. At the 2012 Summer Olympics, he competed in the Men's C-1 200 metres and the Men's C-2 1000 metres (with Fortunato Pacavira).

References

External links
 

Angolan male canoeists
Living people
Olympic canoeists of Angola
Canoeists at the 2012 Summer Olympics
1986 births
Sportspeople from Luanda
African Games silver medalists for Angola
African Games medalists in canoeing
Competitors at the 2011 All-Africa Games